Svatoslav Ton (born 20 October 1978) is a Czech high jumper. His personal best jump is 2.33 metres, achieved in June 2004 in Prague.

Achievements

References

1978 births
Living people
Czech male high jumpers
Athletes (track and field) at the 2004 Summer Olympics
Olympic athletes of the Czech Republic
Sportspeople from Brno